The 1971 Tennessee Volunteers football team (variously "Tennessee", "UT" or the "Vols") represented the University of Tennessee in the 1971 NCAA University Division football season. Playing as a member of the Southeastern Conference (SEC), the team was led by head coach Bill Battle, in his second year, and played their home games at Neyland Stadium in Knoxville, Tennessee. They finished the season with a record of ten wins and two losses (10–2 overall, 4–2 in the SEC) and a victory over Arkansas in the 1971 Liberty Bowl.

Schedule

Personnel

Season summary

at Florida

Third-string quarterback Phil Pierce led Tennessee on a 99-yard drive in the third quarter, capped by a 20-yard touchdown pass to Stan Trott to take the lead for good. The Volunteers lost their first and second-string quarterbacks to knee injuries during the game.

Penn State

Before the game, Bobby Majors was honored alongside his brothers, Iowa State head coach Johnny and the late Billy, for the family's overall contribution to the school's football program. Majors finished his final home game with 195 return yards on kicks and punts. With the win, the Volunteers accepted a bid to play in the Liberty Bowl against Arkansas.

Team players drafted into the NFL

References

Tennessee
Tennessee Volunteers football seasons
Liberty Bowl champion seasons
Tennessee Volunteers football